Holenarasipur Assembly seat is one of the seats in Karnataka Legislative Assembly in India.

It is a segment of Hassan Lok Sabha seat.

Members of Assembly

Election results

1967 Assembly Election
 H. D. Devegowda (IND) : 20,594 votes    
 H. D. Doddegowda (INC) : 12,191

1989 Assembly Election
 G Puttaswamy Gowda (Cong) : 53,297 votes  
 H. D. Devegowda (Janata Party - JP faction) : 45,461
 H Krishna Murthy (Janata Dal) : 500 votes

2018 Assembly Election
 H D Revanna (JD-S) : 108,541 votes  
 Manjegowda B P (Cong) : 64,709
 M N Raju (BJP) : 3,667

See also 
 List of constituencies of Karnataka Legislative Assembly

References 

Assembly constituencies of Karnataka